Israel Breslow (1906 in Russian Empire – July 28, 1985 in New York City) was a garment worker, local union manager, union staffer, and Vice-President of the International Ladies' Garment Workers' Union (ILGWU).

Biography

Israel Breslow was born in the Russian Empire, emigrated to Canada, and settled in New York City where he had a long career with the ILGWU. Breslow was a member of the Amalgamated Clothing Workers of America from 1922 to 1936 while working in Canada. In 1936, after moving to New York City and beginning work as an operator in the garment industry, Breslow joined Dressmakers Local 22. Breslow served on the local's executive board and as business agent, before eventually being elected manager of Local 22, serving in that role from 1958 to 1975. In 1962, Breslow became a Vice-President of the ILGWU.

He retired from the ILGWU in 1975, after which he became president of the Jewish Daily Forward Association. Additionally, Breslow was president of the Workmen's Circle from 1958 to 1962, and again from 1966 to 1970. He died in New York City, at the age of 79.

Sources
ILGWU. Communications Department biography files. 5780/177. Kheel Center for Labor-Management Documentation and Archives, Martin P. Catherwood Library, Cornell University.

"Israel Breslow, Labor Leader Who Led Jewish Organization." The New York Times. 31 Jul. 1985.

External links
 Guide to ILGWU. Local 22. Israel Breslow papers. 5780/067. Kheel Center for Labor-Management Documentation and Archives, Martin P. Catherwood Library, Cornell University. 

Emigrants from the Russian Empire to Canada
Canadian emigrants to the United States
American trade union leaders
International Ladies Garment Workers Union leaders
1906 births
1985 deaths